Jack Frendo Azzopardi (23 October 1915 – 16 January 1981) was a Maltese water polo player. He competed in the men's tournament at the 1936 Summer Olympics.

References

1915 births
1981 deaths
Maltese male water polo players
Olympic water polo players of Malta
Water polo players at the 1936 Summer Olympics
Place of birth missing